Climate action (or climate change action) refers to a range of activities, mechanisms, policy instruments and so forth that aim to reduce the severity of human induced climate change and its impacts. "More climate action" is a central demand of the climate movement. Climate inaction is the absence of climate action. Examples for climate action include:

 Business action on climate change
 Climate change adaptation
 Climate change mitigation
 Climate finance
 Climate movement – actions by non-governmental organizations
 Individual action on climate change
 Politics of climate change

See also
 Effects of climate change

References

Global environmental issues
Human impact on the environment